Charles Walter Forward (1863 – 1934) was a British animal rights and vegetarianism activist and historian of vegetarianism.

Work
Forward authored many publications on vegetarianism and was editor of the Vegetarian Jubilee Library. Forward has been described as a historian of the vegetarian movement. His best known work Fifty Years of Food Reform, was published in 1898. It was the first book to document the history of the vegetarian movement in England and covered vegetarians such as William Lambe, G. Nicholson, John Frank Newton, John Oswald, Richard Phillips, Joseph Ritson and Percy Bysshe Shelley. The book also mentions historical vegetarian ideals expressed from the classical period onward from writers such as Plutarch and Pythagoras. It contains a map of London showing vegetarian restaurants.  

In 1897, Forward edited John Smith's vegetarian book Fruits and Farinacea. The book was heavily criticized by the British Medical Journal as non-scientific. 

Forward speaking at the National Vegetarian Congress in 1899 argued that although the vegetarian movement was increasing, vegetarian restaurants in London had decreased in number. He noted that affordable tinned meat had become widely available and how some of the purported vegetarian restaurants were not strictly vegetarian as they were serving meat dishes.

In 1913, Forward contributed the chapter "Slaughter-House Cruelties" to the book The Under Dog, edited by Sidney Trist. The book documented the wrongs suffered by animals at the hand of man. Forward edited The Animals' Guardian, subtitled "A Humane Journal for the Better Protection of Animals". This monthly periodical was published by the London and Provincial Anti-Vivisection Society.

Diet theories

Forward argued that most diseases including cancer are the result of modern-day unhealthy eating habits because people have shifted from their natural primitive vegetarian diet and are eating less fruit and vegetables. In 1912, Forward was elected Chairman of the Society for the Prevention and Relief of Cancer. From 1914, he lectured on cancer and diet and gave a lecture at The Polytechnic in Regent Street on cancer causes and prevention. Similar to Robert Bell and Douglas Macmillan he held the view that meat eating was a major cause of cancer.

Selected publications
Practical Vegetarian Recipes (1891)
Cameos of Vegetarian Literature (1898)
Dulce Sodalitum: A Selection of Stories and Sketches by Vegetarian Writers (1898)
Popular Vegetarian Cookery (1898)
Fifty Years of Food Reform: A History of the Vegetarian Movement in England (1898)
Vegetariana: A Collection of Facts and Opinions on the Subject of Food Reform (1900)
The Food of the Future: A Summary of Arguments in Favour of a Non-Flesh Diet (1904)
Slaughter-House Cruelties (1913)
Under the Blue Cross (1915)
Health-Giving Dishes (1924)
Vegetarian Races and Their Diet (1921)
The Fruit of the Tree: An Argument on Behalf of Man's Primitive and Natural Diet (1922) 
Butcher's Meat, and its Effects Upon the Human Body (1923)
Nuts: Their Cultivation, Composition and Use as Food (1924)
The Golden Calf: An Exposure of Vaccine Therapy (1932)

References

Further reading

Charles W. Forward. In Food, Home and Garden. (May, 1897).

1863 births
1934 deaths
19th-century British historians
19th-century British male writers
19th-century British writers
19th-century British non-fiction writers
20th-century British historians
20th-century British male writers
20th-century British non-fiction writers
Alternative cancer treatment advocates
Anti-vivisectionists
British animal rights activists
British food writers
British cookbook writers
British vegetarianism activists
Historians of vegetarianism
Vegetarian cookbook writers